Zhao Zhiwei (born August 8, 1994), also known as Eden Zhao, is a Chinese actor, singer and dancer. He was a member of the Taiwanese boyband SpeXial from 2016 to 2017.

Biography 
Zhao was born in Lanzhou, Gansu on August 8, 1994. He attended and graduated from Shanghai Theater Academy and performed as a dancer for ten years. Throughout the years, he participated in many national and international dance competitions, and has also acted as choreographer. Before graduating, the academy wanted Zhao to stay and serve as a teacher, but he was diagnosed with a serious knee injury that forced him to quit dancing. After that, he decided to become an actor and starred in his first television series, KO One Re-member, in 2016 and officially entered the entertainment industry.

On July 14 of the same year, Zhao became a member of the Taiwanese boyband SpeXial and participated in the recording of their 4th album, Boyz on Fire. Along with several of his bandmates, he participated in the costume drama series Men with Sword.

On March 20, 2017, Zhao announced that he was going to leave SpeXial for unspecified reasons. His departure took place three days later, on March 23, less than a year after joining the group. He was also the second member to leave SpeXial after his bandmate Simon, who left the group on February 2, 2017. Zhao signed with Huace Media following his departure to embark on his acting activities.

In 2019, Zhao starred in the romance web series Le Coup de Foudre, and Walk Into Your Memory.

Filmography

Television series

Film

Variety show

Theater

Discography

References

External links 

 Official web site

1994 births
Living people
Chinese male film actors
Chinese male television actors
21st-century Chinese male actors
Chinese pop singers
Chinese idols
21st-century Chinese male singers